Bible Grove Consolidated District #5 School, also known as Bible Grove School, is a historic school building south of Route T. at Bible Grove, Scotland County, Missouri. It was built in 1921, and is a two-story rectangular brick building with a full basement.  It measures 36 feet by 48 feet, and has a bellcast roof featuring wide eaves, rows of original windows, a double-leaf entrance with a fanlight.  The school closed in 1995.

It was added to the National Register of Historic Places in 2000.

References

School buildings on the National Register of Historic Places in Missouri
School buildings completed in 1921
Schools in Scotland County, Missouri
National Register of Historic Places in Scotland County, Missouri
1921 establishments in Missouri